The BIG-register (acronym: beroepen in de individuele gezondheidszorg; Dutch: professions in the individual healthcare) is a Dutch online registry for healthcare professionals. Healthcare professionals, such as physicians and 12 other professions, are required by law to register in the BIG-register before they can practise their profession or use their protected professional titles. The registry is freely accessible online, creating a method for the public to review whether or not their healthcare provider is registered.

History 
The registry was introduced on 1 December 1997 when the 1993 law on professions in the individual healthcare came into effect (Dutch: Wet op de beroepen in de individuele gezondheidszorg), replacing the 1865 law on exercising healthcare (Dutch: Wet Uitoefening Geneeskunst).

Professions 
The following professions are required to register in the BIG-register:
 allied medical care professional (temporary BIG registration; Dutch: bachelor medisch hulpverlener)
 clinical technologist (Dutch: klinisch technoloog)
 dentist (Dutch: tandarts)
 doctor (Dutch: arts)
 health psychologist (Dutch: gezondheidszorgpsycholoog)
 midwife (Dutch: verloskundige)
 nurse (Dutch: verpleegkundige)
 pharmacist (Dutch: apotheker)
 psychotherapist (Dutch: psychotherapeut)
 physician assistant 
 physiotherapist (Dutch: fysiotherapeut)
 registered dental hygienist (temporary BIG registration; Dutch: geregistreerd-mondhygiënist)
 remedial educationalist (Dutch: orthopedagoog-generalist)

Protected professional title, registration, disciplinary law 
Anyone who is not registered is not allowed to refer themselves by the name of the profession, even if they have the right education or practised in the past.

References

Healthcare in the Netherlands